Brian Keith Ebersole (born November 27, 1980) is an American retired mixed martial artist who competed in the UFC's Welterweight division, and holds a record of 5-3 with the organization. In addition to the UFC, Ebersole has competed in Shooto, Strikeforce, the San Jose Razorclaws of the IFL and King of the Cage. Ebersole retired after having 71 professional MMA fights between 2000 and 2016.

Background
Ebersole grew up in Bradley, Illinois. His grandfather started the Bradley-Bourbonnais Youth Wrestling Club in Illinois which served as Ebersole's introduction to amateur wrestling. He began wrestling when he was in kindergarten, was a standout wrestler in middle and high school and earned academic and athletic scholarships to Eastern Illinois University (EIU). He started training with Matt Hughes off and on during his time at EIU, which served as his introduction to mixed martial arts.

In November 2000 Ebersole was arrested following a fight with a Southern Illinois University hockey player. Although the charges were later dropped, Ebersole lost his wrestling scholarship as a result and dropped out of college soon after. Ebersole was a great student, but lost motivation to continue with his education as he could no longer wrestle, leaving with a year's worth of classes not finished. After leaving EIU Ebersole worked on a pig farm before eventually moving to California to train at American Kickboxing Academy (AKA) with Jon Fitch and Bob Cook.

Ebersole is very proud of the fact that he calls the world his home, traveling across the globe for his training camps. He generally trains at Tiger Muay Thai In Phuket as he is the Head Coach and also trains at ESS performance In Melbourne, Australia.

Ebersole is known among MMA fans for his odd manscaping habits, having his chest hair groomed into designs such as arrows, stars, and even the Tapout logo at UFC 140.

Ebersole is currently the head wrestling coach at his alma mater, Bradley-Bourbonnais Community High School.

Mixed martial arts career

Early career
In 2006, Ebersole was living in California, he worked in construction and was also working part-time as a bartender as well as fighting professionally. He claims that the inability to maintain fighting as a full-time profession affected his performances in the cage. In September of that year he took a fight against Shannon Ritch, winning the fight by submission. But the California State Athletic Commission (CSAC) claimed that he and Ritch had worked the fight, and that despite dominating the bout, Ebersole had helped keep Ritch in the fight for longer than he otherwise would have been able to. The CSAC overturned his victory to a no contest and suspended Ebersole. Because of this and the lack of overall MMA opportunities for Ebersole in the US, he decided to pick up and move to Australia, where he had an impressive run on the regional circuit, running up a record of 12 wins and 3 losses over five years.

In 2007, Ebersole was on a trip in the United States to say goodbye to friends and family before setting up permanent residence in Australia. While there he decided to take a short notice fight for the IFL against Alex Schoenauer. Not only did he lose the fight via split decision, but he failed his post-fight drug test for marijuana. Ebersole claimed he had eaten marijuana brownies before taking the fight, and didn't have time to make sure they cleared his system. This resulted in his second suspension by the CSAC, and reinforced his belief in the necessity of his move to Australia to further his fighting career.

Ultimate Fighting Championship
Ebersole made his UFC debut against Chris Lytle at UFC 127, replacing an injured Carlos Condit. Ebersole won via unanimous decision using unorthodox strikes and ground control in a bout that earned Fight of the Night honors.

In his second UFC fight, Ebersole faced veteran Dennis Hallman on August 6, 2011 at UFC 133. He won the fight via TKO in the first round. Ebersole was also awarded an honorary "getting those horrifying shorts off TV as soon as possible" bonus by Dana White for defeating Hallman, who was wearing Speedos (Speedos have since been banned in the UFC).

Ebersole was expected to face Rory MacDonald on December 10, 2011 at UFC 140. However, McDonald pulled out of their fight due to injury. Ebersole instead faced Claude Patrick, where he won a close, back and forth match via split decision.

Ebersole fought TJ Waldburger on June 22, 2012 at UFC on FX 4 and won the fight via unanimous decision (29-28, 29-28, 29-28).  After the bout Ebersole said that he may try to drop down to the lightweight division. If he moves down, it will be the fifth weight class in which he has competed.

Making a quick return to the Octagon less than a month later, Ebersole replaced an injured Claude Patrick and faced James Head on July 21, 2012 at UFC 149. Ebersole received his first UFC loss to Head via split decision snapping his eleven fight winning streak and receiving his first loss since September 2008.

Ebersole made his first appearance in over a year when he fought Rick Story at UFC 167 on November 16, 2013. He lost the fight via unanimous decision.

Ebersole next fought John Howard on September 27, 2014 at UFC 178.  He won the fight via split decision.

Ebersole was expected to face Alan Jouban on June 6, 2015 at UFC Fight Night 68.  However, Jouban pulled out of the fight in late March citing injury and was replaced by Omari Akhmedov. Ebersole lost the fight via TKO after he was unable to continue after the first round due to a knee injury sustained from a kick by Akhmedov. Ebersole announced his retirement after the fight.

Post Retirement
Ebersole would fight one more time, June 24, 2016, facing Steven Kennedy at Hex Fight Series 6. Kennedy won the main event by decision.

Championships and awards

Mixed martial arts
Ultimate Fighting Championship
 Fight of the Night Honors (One time)
Cage Fighting Championship
 Cage Fighting Championship Welterweight Championship (One time)

Mixed martial arts record

|-
|Loss
|align=center| 51–18–1 (1)
|Steven Kennedy
|Decision (unanimous)
|Hex Fight Series 6
|
|align=center|5
|align=center|5:00
|Melbourne, Australia
|
|-
|Loss
|align=center| 51–17–1 (1)
|Omari Akhmedov
|TKO (knee injury)
|UFC Fight Night: Boetsch vs. Henderson
|
|align=center|1
|align=center|5:00
|New Orleans, Louisiana, United States
|
|-
| Win
| align=center| 51–16–1 (1)
| John Howard
| Decision (split)
| UFC 178
| 
| align=center| 3
| align=center| 5:00
| Las Vegas, Nevada, United States
| 
|-
| Loss
| align=center| 50–16–1 (1)
| Rick Story
| Decision (unanimous)
| UFC 167
| 
| align=center| 3
| align=center| 5:00
| Las Vegas, Nevada, United States
| 
|-
| Loss
| align=center| 50–15–1 (1)
| James Head
| Decision (split)
| UFC 149
| 
| align=center| 3
| align=center| 5:00
| Calgary, Alberta, Canada
| 
|-
| Win
| align=center| 50–14–1 (1)
| TJ Waldburger
| Decision (unanimous)
| UFC on FX: Maynard vs. Guida
| 
| align=center| 3
| align=center| 5:00
| Atlantic City, New Jersey, United States
| 
|-
| Win
| align=center| 49–14–1 (1)
| Claude Patrick
| Decision (split)
| UFC 140
| 
| align=center| 3
| align=center| 5:00
| Toronto, Ontario, Canada
| 
|-
| Win
| align=center| 48–14–1 (1)
| Dennis Hallman
| TKO (elbows)
| UFC 133
| 
| align=center| 1
| align=center| 4:28
| Philadelphia, Pennsylvania, United States
|
|-
| Win
| align=center| 47–14–1 (1)
| Chris Lytle
| Decision (unanimous)
| UFC 127
| 
| align=center| 3
| align=center| 5:00
| Sydney, Australia
| 
|-
| Win
| align=center| 46–14–1 (1)
| Hamish Robertson
| TKO (punches)
| LGIOP: Van Diemen's Caged Mayhem
| 
| align=center| 1
| align=center| N/A
| Tasmania, Australia
| 
|-
| Win
| align=center| 45–14–1 (1)
| Carlos Newton
| Decision (unanimous)
| Impact FC 1
| 
| align=center| 3
| align=center| 5:00
| Brisbane, Australia
| 
|-
| Win
| align=center| 44–14–1 (1)
| Martin van Staden
| Submission (inverted triangle choke)
| Fight Force 5: Invasion
| 
| align=center| 3
| align=center| N/A
| Johannesburg, South Africa
| 
|-
| Win
| align=center| 43–14–1 (1)
| Ian James Schaffa
| Submission (arm-triangle choke)
| XMMA 1: Xtreme MMA
| 
| align=center| 2
| align=center| 2:34
| Sydney, Australia
| 
|-
| Win
| align=center| 42–14–1 (1)
| Jai Bradney
| Decision (unanimous)
| CWA: Staunch Cage Wars
| 
| align=center| 3
| align=center| 5:00
| Queensland, Australia
| 
|-
| Win
| align=center| 41–14–1 (1)
| Shannon Forrester
| KO (cartwheel kick)
| XFC: Return of the Hulk
| 
| align=center| 1
| align=center| N/A
| Perth, Australia
| 
|-
| Win
| align=center| 40–14–1 (1)
| Shane Nix
| TKO (knee injury)
| Cage Fighting Championships 6: Eliminator
| 
| align=center| 3
| align=center| 3:29
| Sydney, Australia
| 
|-
| Loss
| align=center| 39–14–1 (1)
| Héctor Lombard
| TKO (submission to punches)
| Cage Fighting Championships 5
| 
| align=center| 4
| align=center| 1:56
| Sydney, Australia
| 
|-
| Win
| align=center| 39–13–1 (1)
| Wade Henderson
| Submission (arm-triangle choke)
| Cage Fighting Championships 4
| 
| align=center| 1
| align=center| 1:25
| Sydney, Australia
| 
|-
| Win
| align=center| 38–13–1 (1)
| Dylan Andrews
| TKO (punches)
| Cage Fighting Championships 3
| 
| align=center| 2
| align=center| 4:26
| Sydney, Australia
| 
|-
| Win
| align=center| 37–13–1 (1)
| Gordon Graff
| Decision (unanimous)
| KOTC: Perth
| 
| align=center| 2
| align=center| 5:00
| Perth, Australia
| 
|-
| Win
| align=center| 36–13–1 (1)
| Jon Valuri
| Decision (unanimous)
| Shooto Australia: Superfight Australia 1
| 
| align=center| 2
| align=center| 5:00
| Perth, Australia
| 
|-
| Loss
| align=center| 35–13–1 (1)
| Alex Schoenauer
| Decision (split)
| IFL: Los Angeles
| 
| align=center| 3
| align=center| 4:00
| Los Angeles, California, United States
| 
|-
| Win
| align=center| 35–12–1 (1)
| David Frendin
| TKO (doctor stoppage)
| XFC 13: Global Warfare
| 
| align=center| 2
| align=center| N/A
| Queensland, Australia
| 
|-
| Loss
| align=center| 34–12–1 (1)
| Kyle Noke
| Decision (majority)
| XFC 12: Oktoberfist
| 
| align=center| 5
| align=center| 5:00
| Australia
| 
|-
| NC
| align=center| 34–11–1 (1)
| Shannon Ritch
| NC (overturned)
| FCP: Malice at Cow Palace
| 
| align=center| 1
| align=center| 3:46
| San Francisco, California, United States
| 
|-
| Win
| align=center| 34–11–1
| Andrew Varney
| Decision (unanimous)
| LOF 8: Legends of Fighting 8
| 
| align=center| 3
| align=center| 5:00
| Indianapolis, Indiana, United States
| 
|-
| Win
| align=center| 33–11–1
| Matt Horwich
| Decision (unanimous)
| Strikeforce: Shamrock vs. Gracie
| 
| align=center| 3
| align=center| 5:00
| San Jose, California, United States
| 
|-
| Win
| align=center| 32–11–1
| Alex Serdyukov
| Decision (unanimous)
| ICFO 1: Stockton
| 
| align=center| 3
| align=center| 5:00
| Stockton, California, United States
| 
|-
| Win
| align=center| 31–11–1
| Andy Foster
| Decision (unanimous)
| FT 6: Full Throttle 6
| 
| align=center| 3
| align=center| 5:00
| Atlanta, Georgia, United States
| 
|-
| Loss
| align=center| 30–11–1
| Masanori Suda
| Submission (rear-naked choke)
| Shooto: 1/29 in Korakuen Hall
| 
| align=center| 3
| align=center| 2:59
| Tokyo, Japan
| 
|-
| Win
| align=center| 
| Gordon Kalimic
| Submission (arm-triangle choke)
| MMA Mexico: Day 1
| 
| align=center| 1
| align=center| N/A
| Ciudad Juárez, Mexico
| 
|-
| Loss
| align=center| 29–10–1
| John Renken
| Decision (unanimous)
| FFC 12: Freestyle Fighting Championships 12
| 
| align=center| 3
| align=center| 5:00
| Indiana, United States
| 
|-
| Win
| align=center| 29–9–1
| Nick Thompson
| TKO (punches)
| FFC 12: Freestyle Fighting Championships 12
| 
| align=center| 1
| align=center| N/A
| Indiana, United States
| 
|-
| Loss
| align=center| 28–9–1
| Ed Herman
| Submission (triangle choke)
| SF 5: Stadium
| 
| align=center| 2
| align=center| N/A
| Gresham, Oregon, United States
| 
|-
| Win
| align=center| 28–8–1
| Alexei Veselovzorov
| TKO (punches)
| Euphoria: Russia vs USA
| 
| align=center| 3
| align=center| 2:26
| Atlantic City, New Jersey, United States
| 
|-
| Win
| align=center| 27–8–1
| Todd Carney
| Decision (unanimous)
| KOTR: King of the Rockies 1 
| 
| align=center| 4
| align=center| 5:00
| Fort Collins, Colorado, United States
| 
|-
| Win
| align=center| 26–8–1
| Shane Tate
| TKO (punches)
| EP: XXXtreme Impact
| 
| align=center| 1
| align=center| 1:38
| Tijuana, Mexico
| 
|-
| Win
| align=center| 25–8–1
| Emanuel Newton
| TKO (punches)
| CFM: Ultimate Fighting Mexico
| 
| align=center| 4
| align=center| N/A
| Monterrey, Mexico
| 
|-
| Draw
| align=center| 24–8–1
| Brad Lynde
| Draw
| FCC 12: Freestyle Combat Challenge 12
| 
| align=center| 2
| align=center| 5:00
| Racine, Wisconsin, United States
| 
|-
| Win
| align=center| 24–8
| Chris Fontaine
| Decision (unanimous)
| CFM: Octogono Extremo
| 
| align=center| 3
| align=center| 4:00
| Monterrey, Mexico
| 
|-
| Loss
| align=center| 23–8
| Tony Fryklund
| Submission (ankle lock)
| Dangerzone 17: Dakota Destruction
| 
| align=center| 2
| align=center| 4:37
| New Town, North Dakota, United States
| 
|-
| Win
| align=center| 23–7
| David Harris
| Decision (unanimous)
| CFM: Cage Fighting Monterrey
| 
| align=center| 3
| align=center| 5:00
| Monterrey, Mexico
| 
|-
| Win
| align=center| 22–7
| Shannon Ritch
| TKO (punch)
| CFM: Ultimate Fighting
| 
| align=center| 1
| align=center| 3:40
| Monterrey, Mexico
| 
|-
| Loss
| align=center| 21–7
| Bret Bergmark
| Decision (split)
| UA 4: King of the Mountain
| 
| align=center| 3
| align=center| 5:00
| Auberry, California, United States
| 
|-
| Win
| align=center| 21–6
| Tom Martini
| TKO (submission to punches)
| UW: Minnesota
| 
| align=center| 1
| align=center| N/A
| Fridley, Minnesota, United States
| 
|-
| Win
| align=center| 20–6
| Rene Hernandez
| Submission (arm-triangle choke)
| MMA: Cuando Hierve la Sangre
| 
| align=center| 2
| align=center| N/A
| Monterrey, Mexico
| 
|-
| Win
| align=center| 19–6
| Shane Schartzer
| Submission (kimura)
| MMA: Cuando Hierve la Sangre
| 
| align=center| 1
| align=center| N/A
| Monterrey, Mexico
| 
|-
| Win
| align=center| 18–6
| Joel Blanton
| TKO (punches)
| UW: Minnesota
| 
| align=center| 1
| align=center| 4:00
| Minneapolis, Minnesota, United States
| 
|-
| Win
| align=center| 17–6
| Dan Hart
| Technical Submission (guillotine choke)
| CR 4: Cage Rage 4
| 
| align=center| 1
| align=center| 1:48
| Kokomo, Indiana, United States
| 
|-
| Win
| align=center| 16–6
| Nathan McCabe
| TKO (punches)
| RFC 1: The Beginning
| 
| align=center| 1
| align=center| 2:15
| Las Vegas, Nevada, United States
| 
|-
| Win
| align=center| 15–6
| Desmond Peterson
| TKO (submission to punches)
| BEFC 2: Big Easy Fighting 2
| 
| align=center| 1
| align=center| N/A
| New Orleans, Louisiana, United States
| 
|-
| Win
| align=center| 14–6
| Rich Guerin
| Decision
| CLM 2: Combate Libre Mexico 2
| 
| align=center| N/A
| align=center| N/A
| Mexico
| 
|-
| Win
| align=center| 13–6
| Edwin Aguilar
| Submission (rear-naked choke)
| CLM 2: Combate Libre Mexico 2
| 
| align=center| N/A
| align=center| N/A
| Mexico
| 
|-
| Win
| align=center| 12–6
| Chris Gates
| Submission (armbar)
| CLM 2: Combate Libre Mexico 2
| 
| align=center| N/A
| align=center| N/A
| Mexico
| 
|-
| Loss
| align=center| 11–6
| Jay Massey
| Submission (rear-naked choke)
| TCC: Battle of the Badges
| 
| align=center| 1
| align=center| N/A
| Hammond, Indiana, United States
| 
|-
| Win 
| align=center| 11–5
| Jamie Schell
| KO (punch)
| UW: Horn vs Wikan
| 
| align=center| 2
| align=center| 0:43
| Minnesota, United States
| 
|-
| Win 
| align=center| 10–5
| Josh Mueller
| Submission (rear-naked choke)
| UW: Battle for the Belts
| 
| align=center| 1
| align=center| 0:37
| Minnesota, United States
| 
|-
| Loss 
| align=center| 9–5
| Kerry Schall
| Submission (kneebar)
| UW: Battle for the Belts
| 
| align=center| 1
| align=center| 3:15
| Fridley, Minnesota, United States
| 
|-
| Win 
| align=center| 9–4
| Mark Lowry
| Submission (arm-triangle choke)
| UW: Battle for the Belts
| 
| align=center| 1
| align=center| 3:22
| Fridley, Minnesota, United States
| 
|-
| Loss
| align=center| 8–4
| Stephan Bonnar
| Submission (guillotine choke)
| IHC 3: Exodus
| 
| align=center| 1
| align=center| 0:51
| Hammond, Indiana, United States
| Light Heavyweight bout.
|-
| Win
| align=center| 8–3
| Eric Zent
| Submission (choke)
| CR 3: Cage Rage 3
| 
| align=center| 2
| align=center| 1:00
| Kokomo, Indiana, United States
| 
|-
| Win
| align=center| 7–3
| Ed Meyers
| Submission (choke)
| CR 3: Cage Rage 3
| 
| align=center| 1
| align=center| 3:36
| Kokomo, Indiana, United States
| 
|-
| Loss
| align=center| 6–3
| Adrian Serrano
| Submission (rear-naked choke)
| TCC: Total Combat Challenge
| 
| align=center| 1
| align=center| 5:10
| Hammond, Indiana, United States
| 
|-
| Win
| align=center| 6–2
| Darrell Smith
| Submission (armbar)
| FFCC: Finke's Full Contact Challenge
| 
| align=center| 2
| align=center| N/A
| Highland, Indiana, United States
| 
|-
| Win
| align=center| 5–2
| Josh Hoover
| TKO (submission to slam)
| FFCC: Finke's Full Contact Challenge
| 
| align=center| 3
| align=center| N/A
| Highland, Indiana, United States
| 
|-
| Win
| align=center| 4–2
| Eddie Sanchez
| Decision (unanimous)
| FFCC: Finke's Full Contact Challenge
| 
| align=center| 2
| align=center| 5:00
| Highland, Indiana, United States
| 
|-
| Loss
| align=center| 3–2
| Jay Massey
| Submission (armbar)
| MMA: Invitational 4
| 
| align=center| 1
| align=center| 1:22
| Hammond, Indiana, United States
| 
|-
| Win
| align=center| 3–1
| Jeremy Morrison
| Submission (armbar)
| FFCC: Finke's Full Contact Challenge
| 
| align=center| 1
| align=center| N/A
| Highland, Indiana, United States
| 
|-
| Win
| align=center| 2–1
| Enrique Lowe
| Submission (armbar)
| FFCC: Finke's Full Contact Challenge
| 
| align=center| 1
| align=center| 3:50
| Highland, Indiana, United States
| 
|-
| Win
| align=center| 1–1
| Jose Garcia
| Submission (rear-naked choke)
| TCC: Total Combat Challenge
| 
| align=center| 1
| align=center| N/A
| Chicago, Illinois, United States
| 
|-
| Loss
| align=center| 0–1
| Chris Albandia
| Decision
| TCC: Total Combat Challenge
| 
| align=center| 1
| align=center| 10:00
| Chicago, Illinois, United States
|

See also
 List of current UFC fighters
 List of male mixed martial artists

References

External links

Official UFC Profile

1980 births
Doping cases in mixed martial arts
Living people
American male mixed martial artists
Mixed martial artists from Indiana
Welterweight mixed martial artists
Mixed martial artists utilizing collegiate wrestling
American expatriate sportspeople in Australia
People from La Porte, Indiana
People from Kankakee County, Illinois
Ultimate Fighting Championship male fighters